The Michaëlle Jean Foundation is an independent non-profit organization established by former Governor General of Canada Michaëlle Jean upon her retirement from that position in 2010. Its aim is to collaborate with other Canadian organizations across Canada to work with disadvantaged youth and effect change in their communities through the arts. The co-presidents of the foundation are Michaëlle Jean and her husband Jean-Daniel Lafond who also serves as CEO.

The foundation was established with a contribution of $3 million as by the Canadian Crown-in-Council as a legacy gift and is further funded by private donations, with up to $7 million in matching funds to be provided by the federal Department of Canadian Heritage.

References

External links
Fondation Michaëlle Jean Foundation

Arts organizations based in Canada
2010 establishments in Canada
Organizations established in 2010
Foundations based in Canada